Anoditica is a genus of moths of the family Xyloryctidae.

Species
 Anoditica autopa Meyrick, 1938
 Anoditica concretella Viette, 1956

References

Xyloryctidae
Xyloryctidae genera
Taxa named by Edward Meyrick